Israel competed at the 2013 Summer Universiade also known as the XXVII Summer Universiade, in Kazan (Tatarstan), Russia.

Israeli Andrea Murez representing the United States at the 2013 Summer Universiade was a 4 × 200 m freestyle gold medalist and a 4 × 100 m freestyle silver medalist.

Medals

Medals by sport

Belt wrestling

Men's Classic Style

Women's Freestyle

Sambo

Men's Sambo

Women's Sambo

References

Summer Universiade
Nations at the 2013 Summer Universiade
Israel at the Summer Universiade